Pa Kam-e Pain (also Romanized as Pā Kam-e Pā’īn) is a village in Mosaferabad Rural District, Rudkhaneh District, Rudan County, Hormozgan Province, Iran. At the 2006 census, its population was 32, in 11 families.

References 

Populated places in Rudan County